Peng Qingxing(), (b. November 1938) is professor and PhD mentor of medical humanity in the Aesthetic Medical School of Yichun University, China. He is one of the main initiators of Chinese holistic discipline of medical aesthetics and aesthetic medicine. In 1988, he edited the first global academic book of Medical Aesthetics.

In February 1989, Peng Qingxing founded the Oriental Medical Aesthetics Research Institute, one of the first medical aesthetics in the world.

Works

References 

1938 births
Living people